The Capitol of Palau is the palace of the Palau National Congress. and is located in Ngerulmud, the administrative capital of the country. Its design is based on the United States Capitol.

History
The building's architect is Joseph Farrell of Hawaii. Planning began in 1986 with construction from 1999 to 2006.

Details

The complex has three wings:

 Legislative Building (Central Wing) housing the Palau National Congress
 Executive Building (West Wing) housing the Government of Palau (President and cabinet) 
 Judicial building (East Wing) housing the Supreme Court of Palau's Appellate Division.

References 

Government buildings with domes
Palau
Ngerulmud